Butchers Hill is a neighborhood in Southeast Baltimore, Maryland, United States. It is north of Fells Point, east of Washington Hill, and northwest of Patterson Park. It is south of Fayette Street, west of Patterson Park Avenue, north of Pratt Street, and east of Washington Street. It is in the 21231 zip code.

As its name suggests, Butchers Hill was once home to butchers and poultry preparers, many who were German American and Jewish American. It was a village prior to the Civil War. Although today it is considered to be less affluent than Fells Point, it was once the more prosperous community of the two. This is reflected in the larger size of the rowhouses. Butchers Hill is in proximity to more gentrified sections of Fells Point, the draw of Patterson Park, and the employment center on Johns Hopkins Hospital. Many artists reside in the neighborhood. A portion of it is a historic district listed on the National Register of Historic Places.

Many of the homes in this area have recently seen extensive renovations and urban development, and as a result, the neighborhood is increasingly popular among young professionals. Butchers Hill is a popular residence for students, residents, and staff at the nearby Johns Hopkins School of Medicine and Johns Hopkins Hospital, and is one of the neighborhoods eligible for the Johns Hopkins "Live Near Your Work" grant incentive program toward down payments for full-time employees to purchase a home in the neighborhood.

Laura Lippman's novel Butchers Hill tells the story of a private investigator working in this part of Baltimore.

Demographics
As of the census of 2010, there were 1,967 people living in the neighborhood. The racial makeup of Butchers Hill was 51.9% White, 25.4% African American, 3.3% Native American, 2.6% Asian, 3.4% from other races, and 2.6% from  two or more races. Hispanic or Latino of any race were  16.7% of the population. 43.6% of occupied housing units were owner-occupied. 24.6% of housing units were vacant. Butchers Hill is a popular neighborhood for students from the nearby Johns Hopkins medical campus.

74.6% of the population were employed, 2.3% were unemployed, and 23.1% were not in the labor force. The median household income was $36,636. About 23.9% of families and 23.5% of the population were below the poverty line.

Butchers Hill is home to many Irish-Americans, Polish-Americans, and Ukrainian-Americans, as well as African-Americans, Lumbee Native Americans, and a growing Hispanic and Latino population.

References

External links

"These East Baltimore Neighborhoods are Moving Toward a Resurgence," D. C. Culbertson, Baltimore Sun
Butchers Hill Association
Butchers Hill Historic District
Demographics from Neighborhood Indicators Alliance
, including photo from 2004, at Maryland Historical Trust
Boundary Map of the Butchers Hill Historic District, Baltimore City

 
Baltimore National Heritage Area
German-American culture in Baltimore
Hispanic and Latino American culture in Baltimore
Historic districts in Baltimore
Historic districts on the National Register of Historic Places in Maryland
Historic Jewish communities in the United States
Houses in Baltimore
Jews and Judaism in Baltimore
Neighborhoods in Baltimore
Victorian architecture in Maryland
Houses on the National Register of Historic Places in Baltimore
Southeast Baltimore